The 1998 Italian Superturismo Championship was the twelfth edition of the Italian Superturismo Championship. The season began in Binetto on 17 May and finished in Vallelunga on 4 October, after ten rounds. Fabrizio Giovanardi won the championship, driving an Alfa Romeo 156; the Italian manufacturer won the constructors' championship, while Fabian Peroni took the privateers' trophy.

Teams and drivers

Race calendar and results

Championship standings

Drivers' Championship

Manufacturers' Trophy

Privateers' Championship

External links
1998 Drivers List
1998 Standings

Italian Superturismo Championship